The Supreme Council of the Cultural Revolution (SCCR; , shoraye a'ali enqelabe farhangi) is a conservative-dominated body based in Qom, set up at the time of Ayatollah Khomeini. Its decisions can only be overruled by Iran's Supreme Leader. Most of its members were appointed by Ali Khamenei, Khomeini's successor.

The President of Iran is ex officio the chairman of the Council.

History

The Supreme Cultural Revolution Council that was formed in December 1984 was in fact continuation of the Cultural Revolution Headquarters.
This council debates and approves its own relevant issues. The Khomeini used to say that such approved issues must be regarded as laws. He did not mean that Supreme Council of the Cultural Revolution was a legislative organ. However, its ratified bills are valid as approved laws. In accordance with the instructions of the late Khomeini, one must not overrule the approved issues of this council.
The headquarters took shape on 12 June 1980 and following a decree by Khomeini the council was charged to take measures in planning for various courses and for the cultural policy of the universities in future on the basis of Islamic culture and through selection of efficient, committed and vigilant professors and for other issues relevant to the Islamic academic revolution.

The Cultural Revolution Headquarters failed to make universities ready for building the future. The headquarters deleted certain courses such as music as "fake knowledge." Committees established after the 1979 Revolution came to similar conclusions concerning all subjects in the humanities such as law, political sciences, economy, psychology, education and sociology.

The SCRC was formed in December 1984 and substituted the Cultural Revolution Headquarters. In fact, the formation of such an institution was not stipulated in the Constitution. It was formed under the special circumstances that were prevailing in the early stages of the revolution. The council took its legitimacy from the 9 December 1984 decree of the founder of the Islamic Republic Ayatollah Khomeini.

Following the formation of the SCRC, it declared itself the highest body for making policies and decisions in connection with cultural, educational and research activities within the framework of the general policies of the system and considered its approvals indispensable. In fact, the group of 7 (in 1980-83, and then 17 in 1984, and expanded to 36 in 1999) was expected to compile all the cultural policies of the country.

The SCRC blocked the way to the emergence of the student movement in 1983-1989 period by banning many books and purging thousands of students and lecturers. Through selection of applicants who wished to enter universities and by the formation of institutions inside universities, the council took control of the affairs of all university students.

In 1996 Hojjateslam Mohammad Khatami was appointed as a member of High Council for Cultural Revolution by the Supreme Leader of Iran. As President he was the head of the council.

In October 2001 the SCRC ordered all private Internet access companies under state control. The order was never implemented, but parliament considered legislation that would require Internet providers to block access to adult sites and others.

On 10 June 2003, judiciary spokesman Gholam-Hossein Elham explained that a lack of adequate, government-imposed filtering would "pollute the climate" of Internet sites so that those seeking information would be put off from using the sites. They would thus be deprived of their natural rights to gain knowledge. Elham explained that an advisory committee of the SCRC would take charge of filtering. Elham listed more than 20 matters that would likely be filtered.

As president, Mahmoud Ahmadinejad was appointed ex officio by the Supreme Leader of Iran as a member of High Council for Cultural Revolution in 2005. The president is by virtue of his position the chair of the council.

On 17 January 2023, Abdol Hossein Khosrow Panah was elected as Secretary of Council by members of Council for four years.

Goals
The declared goal of the Supreme Council of the Cultural Revolution is to ensure that the education and culture of Iran remains "100% Islamic" as Ayatollah Khomeini directed. This includes working against outside "cultural influences" and ideologies.

Main Members of Cultural Revolution Headquarters
First core of Cultural Revolution Headquarters between 1980–1987

Current members
All the 28 members  of council are selected by Supreme Leader of Iran.

Individual Members
 Abdol Hossein Khosrow Panah (Secretary)
 Saied Reza Ameli
 Alireza Arafi
 Iman Eftekhary
 Amir Hossein Bankipour Fard
 Hamid Parsania
 Adel Peyghami
 Gholam-Ali Haddad-Adel
 Hassan Rahimpour Azghadi
 Ali Akbar Rashad
 Mohammad Hossein Saei
 Ebrahim Souzanchi Kashani
 Mansour Kabganian
 Ali Larijani
 Mahmoud Mohammadi Araghi
 Mohammad Reza Mokhber Dezfouli
 Morteza Mirbagheri 
 Sadegh Vaez-Zadeh
 Ahmad Vaezi

Ex officio Members
 President of Iran - Ebrahim Raisi - (Chairman)
 Speaker of the Parliament - Mohammad Bagher Ghalibaf (First Deputy of Chairman)
 Chief of Justice - Gholam-Hossein Mohseni-Eje'i (Second Deputy of Chairman)
 Ministry of Culture and Islamic Guidance - Mohammad Mehdi Esmaili 
 Ministry of Science, Research and Technology - Mohammad  Ali Zolfigol
 Ministry of Education - Yousef Nouri 
 Vice Presidency for Women and Family Affairs - Ensieh Khazali
 Council of Cultural-Social of Women and Family - Kobra Khazali
 Islamic Republic of Iran Broadcasting - Peyman Jebelli
 Islamic propagation Organization - Mohammad Qomi

Important events

Iranian Cultural Revolution
The Cultural Revolution (1980–1983) (in Persian: Enqelābe Farhangi) was a period following the 1979 Islamic Revolution in Iran where the academia of Iran was purged of Western and non-Islamic influences to bring it in line with Shia Islam. The official name used by the Islamic Republic is "Cultural Revolution."

Directed by the Cultural Revolutionary Headquarters, the revolution initially closed universities for three years (1980–1983) and after reopening banned many books and purged thousands of students and lecturers from the schools.  The cultural revolution involved a certain amount of violence in taking over the university campuses since higher education in Iran at the time was dominated by leftists forces opposed to Ayatollah Khomeini's vision of theocracy, and they (unsuccessfully) resisted Khomeiniist control at many universities. How many students or faculty were killed is not known.

The process of purification of the education system of foreign influences has not been without sacrifice. In addition to interrupting the education and professional livelihood of many, and initiating a revolutionary intellectual era, it contributed to the emigration of many teachers and technocrats. The loss of job skills and capital has weakened Iran's economy.

After 2009 Iranian Election Protests 
After 2009 Iranian Election Protests Iran's Supreme Council of Cultural Revolution announced in December 2009 that it had removed opposition leader Mir-Hossein Mousavi from his position as head of the Academy of Arts, apparently at the behest of President Mahmoud Ahmadinejad.

Mousavi, a successful artist and architect, had been the head of the academy since it was founded in 1998 and even designed the building that houses it. Mousavi's removal from his post at the academy has provoked outrage from his colleagues, with 27 of 30 faculty members threatening to resign in solidarity, the faculty members who have sided with Mousavi include his wife, Zahra Rahnavard, celebrated miniaturist Mahmoud Farshchian and renowned film directors Majid Majidi and Dariush Mehrjui.

See also
 Iranian Cultural Revolution
 Politics of Iran
 Iranian Revolution
 General Culture Council (Iran)
 Supreme Leader Representation in Universities (organization)

External links
 Official website of Supreme Council of the Cultural Revolution

References

Politics of Iran
Government of the Islamic Republic of Iran
Cultural organisations based in Iran
Organisations of the Iranian Revolution
Ruhollah Khomeini
Revolutionary institutions of the Islamic Republic of Iran